The voiced palatal plosive or stop is a type of consonantal sound in some vocal languages. The equivalent X-SAMPA symbol is J\.

The equivalent X-SAMPA symbols are J\_+ and d_-' or d_-_j, respectively. There is also a non-IPA letter  ("d" with the curl found in the symbols for alveolo-palatal sibilant fricatives ), used especially in Sinological circles.

 is a less common sound worldwide than the voiced postalveolar affricate  because it is difficult to get the tongue to touch just the hard palate without also touching the back part of the alveolar ridge. It is also common for the symbol  to be used to represent a palatalized voiced velar plosive or palato-alveolar/alveolo-palatal affricates, as in Indic languages. That may be considered appropriate when the place of articulation needs to be specified, and the distinction between plosive and affricate is not contrastive.

There is also the voiced post-palatal plosive in some languages, which is articulated slightly more back than the place of articulation of the prototypical palatal consonant but not as back as the prototypical velar consonant. The equivalent X-SAMPA symbols are J\_- and g_+, respectively.

Especially in broad transcription, the voiced post-palatal plosive may be transcribed as a palatalized voiced velar plosive ( in the IPA, g' or g_j in X-SAMPA).

Features

Features of the voiced palatal stop:

 
 The otherwise identical post-palatal variant is articulated slightly behind the hard palate, making it sound closer to the velar .
 Alveolo-palatal variant is articulated also with the blade of the tongue at or behind the alveolar ridge.

Occurrence

Palatal or alveolo-palatal

Post-palatal

See also
 Index of phonetics articles

Notes

References

External links
 

Palatal consonants
Plosives
Central consonants
Voiced oral consonants
Pulmonic consonants